Antiguan may refer to:
 Antigua, the main island of Antigua and Barbuda
 Antigua and Barbuda, a sovereign state in the West Indies
 A person from Antigua
 List of Antiguans and Barbudans

See also 
 Antigua (disambiguation)
 Barbudan (disambiguation)
 

Language and nationality disambiguation pages